Bošice is a municipality and village in Prachatice District in the South Bohemian Region of the Czech Republic. It has about 400 inhabitants.

Administrative parts
Villages of Budilov, Hradčany and Záhoří are administrative parts of Bošice.

References

Villages in Prachatice District